The Legislature of San Luis is the local legislature of the Argentinian province of San Luis. It is a bicameral body, comprising the 43 members of the Chamber of Deputies of San Luis, and the Senate of San Luis with 9 members. It is one of eight bicameral legislatures in the country.

It is elected by a general provincial first-past-the-post voting (Senate), proportional representation (Chamber), and renewed every 2 years by electing a new half of each house. Each representative serves a four-year term. The Provincial Constitution denotes its legislative powers.

The Legislature meets in the provincial capital.

See also

 List of provincial legislatures in Argentina
 Parliament of Argentina

References

Bicameral legislatures
Government of Argentina
San Luis Province
San Luis